The term Sacred Band, also Sacred Company or Sacred Squadron (from ,) can refer to one of the following military units:

In the ancient world:

 Sacred Band of Thebes
 Sacred Band of Carthage

In modern Greek history, the name has been used to denote several military units:

 Sacred Band (1821) of the Greek War of Independence
 Cretan Sacred Band during the Cretan Revolt of 1866–1869
 Cretan Student's Sacred Band, which participated in the Balkan Wars as a part of the Hellenic Army
 Epirote Sacred Band (1914), formed during the establishment of the Autonomous Republic of Northern Epirus.
 Sacred Band (World War II), a special forces unit composed entirely of officers

In fiction:

 the Sacred Band of Stepsons is a mythical Sacred Band of ancient cavalry fighters that eventually unites with the survivors of the Sacred Band of Thebes in a seven-novel saga

See also
 Sacred Squadron (disambiguation)